Silos or Santo Domingo de Silos is a Colombian municipality and town located in the department of North Santander.

It is the only municipality founded in Colombia by a German, Ambrosio Alfinger, in 1531.

See also
 Santo Domingo de Silos, Spain

References
  Government of Norte de Santander - Silos
  Silos official website

Municipalities of the Norte de Santander Department
Populated places established in 1531